Mandrosohasina is a municipality in Madagascar. It belongs to the district of Antsirabe II, which is a part of Vakinankaratra Region. The population of the commune was estimated to be approximately 20,000 in 2001 commune census.

Only primary schooling is available. The majority 99% of the population of the commune are farmers, while an additional 1% receives their livelihood from raising livestock. The most important crops are rice and potatoes; also vegetables are an important agricultural product.

Roads
Mandrosohasina is at the crossroad of the National road 7 and the National road 43.

References and notes 

Populated places in Vakinankaratra